The Burnett School of Medicine (formerly TCU and UNTHSC School of Medicine) is the graduate medical school of Texas Christian University (TCU) located in Fort Worth, Texas. The school welcomed its first class of 60 students in July 2019.

History 
In July 2015, TCU and the University of North Texas Health Science Center at Fort Worth (UNTHSC) announced their plans to jointly open an allopathic medical school in Fort Worth. The school received preliminary accreditation from the Liaison Committee on Medical Education in October 2018 and welcomed its first class of 60 students in July 2019. TCU maintained accredited as the degree-granting institution, with faculty and staff employed by the university, while under joint operation and governance with UNTHSC on the university's campus. For the 2020-2021 application cycle there were 8,190 applications for 60 seats.

On January 12, 2022, TCU and UNTHSC announced the end of their joint partnership, with TCU solely responsible for the operation and governance of the renamed TCU School of Medicine. UNTHSC will continue to operate the separate Texas College of Osteopathic Medicine on their Fort Worth campus.

Teaching Facilities 
The school's primary education and research facilities are currently located on the 33-acre UNTHSC campus in the Fort Worth Cultural District, located 3 miles south of the TCU campus. In February of 2022, TCU announced it had acquired land in the medical innovation district of Fort Worth's Near Southside neighborhood, with plans to complete a new 4-story, approximately 100,000 square foot full medical school campus in 2024.

The TCU School of Medicine has clinical partnerships with Baylor Scott & White All Saints Medical Center, Baylor Scott & White – Grapevine, Baylor Surgical Hospital at Fort Worth, Cook Children's Health Care System, JPS Health Network, Texas Health Harris Methodist Hospital Alliance Texas Health Fort Worth, and Texas Health Harris Methodist Hospital Southwest Fort Worth.

References 

Medical schools in Texas
Medicine